The 2023 NCAA Division I FBS football season will be the 154th season of college football in the United States organized by the National Collegiate Athletic Association (NCAA) at its highest level of competition, the Football Bowl Subdivision (FBS). The regular season will begin on August 26 and end on December 9. The postseason will begin on December 15, and, aside from any all-star games that are scheduled, end on January 8, 2024, with the College Football Playoff National Championship at NRG Stadium in Houston, Texas. This will be the tenth and final season of using the four team College Football Playoff (CFP) system, with the bracket expansion set for 12 teams for the 2024 season.

Rule changes
The following rules changes were proposed by the NCAA Football Rules Committee for the 2023 season:
 Mirroring the NFL rule adopted in the 2005 NFL season, teams may not call consecutive timeouts during a single dead ball period.  Doing so results in a 15 yard penalty for unsportsmanlike conduct.
 Accepted penalties committed on the last play of the first or third quarter will no longer result in an untimed down before the period ends.  The penalty enforcement will be marked off and the second or fourth quarter will begin with the ball at the new spot.
 Modifying a rule adopted in the 1968 season, the game clock will no longer be stopped for first downs on offense except inside of the final two minutes of each half.  This is similar to a rule used in the current incarnations of the USFL and XFL.  The NFL does not stop the game clock for first downs at any time in the game.
 When there is not a replay official in the booth, the on-field officials will have optional replay available in the event of a coaches' challenge. This rule was trialed in the Division II Mid-America Intercollegiate Athletics Association in its 2022 conference season.
 Establishing guidelines for second-half warmup activities, including requiring teams to wait until the field is made available to return and having designated areas of the field to warm up.
 When teams are on the field, drones are not allowed over the playing surface or the team area.

Other headlines

Conference realignment

Two schools are playing their first FBS seasons in 2023. Sam Houston (from the Western Athletic Conference) and Jacksonville State (from the ASUN Conference) began transitions from Division I FCS in 2022 and will join Conference USA in July 2023.

Two other Independent schools, Liberty and New Mexico State, are joining Conference USA in 2023; those schools had respectively been full members of the ASUN and WAC.

Six schools from Conference USA are joining the American Athletic Conference for the 2023 season—Charlotte, Florida Atlantic, North Texas, Rice, UAB, and UTSA. This follows three schools from The American, Cincinnati, Houston, and UCF, leaving the conference for the Big 12 Conference in 2023. In addition, BYU, previously an FBS independent and otherwise a member of the non-football West Coast Conference, is joining the Big 12.

The 2023 season is expected to be the last for four FBS teams in their current conferences:

In addition to Sam Houston and Jacksonville State, one other FCS school will start a transition to FBS in the 2023 season.
 Kennesaw State will leave the ASUN Conference for C-USA. It will play the 2023 season as an FCS independent, while remaining in the ASUN for other sports, before joining C-USA in 2024.

Stadiums

Kickoff games
Rankings reflect the AP Poll entering each week.

"Week Zero"
The regular season will begin on Saturday, August 26 with seven games in Week 0.

Aer Lingus College Football Classic (Aviva Stadium, Dublin, Ireland): Navy vs. Notre Dame
FIU at Louisiana Tech
Hawaii at Vanderbilt
Ohio at San Diego State
San Jose State at USC
UMass at New Mexico State
UTEP at Jacksonville State

Week 1
Chick-fil-A Kickoff: Louisville vs. Georgia Tech (at Mercedes-Benz Stadium, Atlanta, GA)
 Camping World Kickoff:
 Florida State vs. LSU (at Camping World Stadium, Orlando, FL)

Top 10 matchups
Rankings through Week 9 reflect the AP Poll. Rankings for Week 10 and beyond will list College Football Playoff Rankings first and AP Poll second. Teams that failed to be a top 10 team for one poll or the other will be noted.

Regular season

Bowl games

FCS team wins over FBS teams

Upsets
This section lists instances of unranked teams defeating AP Poll-ranked teams during the season.

Regular season

Bowl games
Rankings in this section are based on the final CFP rankings released on December 3, 2023.

Conference standings

Rankings

The top 25 from the AP and USA Today Coaches Polls.

Pre-season polls

CFB Playoff final rankings
In December 2023, the College Football Playoff selection committee will announce its final team rankings for the year.

Final rankings

Conference summaries
Rankings in this section are based CFP rankings released prior to the games.

Conference champions' bowl games
Ranks are per the final CFP rankings, released on December 2023, with win–loss records at that time.

CFP College Football Playoff participant

Postseason

There are 41 team-competitive FBS post-season bowl games, with two teams advancing to a 42nd – the CFP National Championship game. Normally, a team is required to have a .500 minimum winning percentage during the regular season to become bowl-eligible (six wins for an 11- or 12-game schedule, and seven wins for a 13-game schedule). If there are not enough winning teams to fulfill all open bowl slots, teams with losing records may be chosen to fill all 82 bowl slots. Additionally, on the rare occasion in which a conference champion does not meet eligibility requirements, they are usually still chosen for bowl games via tie-ins for their conference.

Bowl-eligible teams
ACC:
American:
Big Ten:
Big 12:
C-USA:
MAC:
Mountain West:
Pac-12:
SEC:
Sun Belt:
Independent:

Bowl-ineligible teams 
ACC:
American:
Big Ten:
Big 12:
C-USA (2): Jacksonville State, Sam Houston
MAC:
Mountain West:
Pac-12:
SEC:
Sun Belt :
Independent:

Number of bowl-ineligible teams: 2

College Football Playoff

Conference performance in bowl games

All-star games
Each of these games features college seniors, or players whose college football eligibility is ending, who are individually invited by game organizers. These games are scheduled to follow the team-competitive bowls, to allow players selected from bowl teams to participate. The all-star games may include some players from non-FBS programs.

Awards and honors

Heisman Trophy
The Heisman Trophy is given to the year's most outstanding player.

Other overall
 AP Player of the Year:  
 Lombardi Award (top player): 
 Maxwell Award (top player):  
 SN Player of the Year:  
 Walter Camp Award (top player):

Special overall
 Burlsworth Trophy (top player who began as walk-on):  
 Paul Hornung Award (most versatile player):  
 Jon Cornish Trophy (top Canadian player): 
 Campbell Trophy ("academic Heisman"): 
 Academic All-American of the Year:
 Wuerffel Trophy (humanitarian-athlete):

Offense
Quarterback
 Davey O'Brien Award: 
 Johnny Unitas Golden Arm Award (senior/4th year quarterback): 
 Manning Award:

Running back
 Doak Walker Award:

Wide receiver
 Fred Biletnikoff Award:

Tight end
 John Mackey Award:

Lineman:
Rimington Trophy (center): 
Outland Trophy (interior lineman on either offense or defense): 
Joe Moore Award (offensive line):

Defense
 Bronko Nagurski Trophy (defensive player): 
 Chuck Bednarik Award (defensive player):  
 Lott Trophy (defensive impact):

Defensive front
 Dick Butkus Award (linebacker):  
 Ted Hendricks Award (defensive end):

Defensive back
 Jim Thorpe Award:

Special teams
 Lou Groza Award (placekicker):  
 Ray Guy Award (punter):  
 Jet Award (return specialist):
 Patrick Mannelly Award (long snapper): 
 Peter Mortell Holder of the Year Award:

Coaches
 AFCA Coach of the Year: 
 AP Coach of the Year:  
 Bobby Dodd Coach of the Year: 
 Eddie Robinson Coach of the Year:  
 George Munger Award:  
 Home Depot Coach of the Year:  
 Paul "Bear" Bryant Award:
 Walter Camp Coach of the Year:

Assistants
 AFCA Assistant Coach of the Year:
 Broyles Award:

All-Americans

Coaching changes

Preseason and in-season
This is restricted to coaching changes taking place on or after May 1, 2023, and will include any changes announced after a team's last regularly scheduled game but before its bowl game. For coaching that occurred earlier in 2023, see 2022 NCAA Division I FBS end-of-season coaching changes

End of season
The list includes coaching changes announced during the season that did not take effect until the end of season.

Television viewers and ratings

Most watched regular season games

Conference championship games

Most watched non-CFP bowl games

New Year Six and College Football Playoff semifinal games

See also
 2023 NCAA Division I FCS football season
 2023 NCAA Division II football season
 2023 NCAA Division III football season
 2023 NAIA football season

Notes

References